The Annals of Mathematical Statistics was a peer-reviewed statistics journal published by the Institute of Mathematical Statistics from 1930 to 1972. It was superseded by the Annals of Statistics and the Annals of Probability.  In 1938, Samuel Wilks became editor-in-chief of the Annals and recruited a remarkable editorial staff: Fisher, Neyman, Cramér, Hotelling, Egon Pearson, Georges Darmois, Allen T. Craig, Deming, von Mises, H. L. Rietz, and Shewhart.

References

External links
 Annals of Mathematical Statistics at Project Euclid

Statistics journals
Probability journals